Omphalocera is a genus of snout moths. It was described by Julius Lederer in 1863.

Species
 Omphalocera cariosa Lederer, 1863
 Omphalocera munroei E. L. Martin, 1956
 Omphalocera occidentalis Barnes & Benjamin, 1924

References

Megarthridiini
Pyralidae genera